The history of Saxony began with a small tribe living on the North Sea between the Elbe and Eider River in what is now Holstein. The name of this tribe, the Saxons (Latin: Saxones), was first mentioned by the Greek author Ptolemy. The name Saxons is derived from the Seax, a knife used by the tribe as a weapon.

In the 3rd and 4th centuries, Germany was inhabited by great tribal confederations of the Alamanni, Bavarians, Thuringians, Franks, Frisii, and Saxons. These took the place of numerous petty tribes with their own popular tribal forms of government. With the exception of the Saxons, all these confederations were ruled by kings. The Saxons, in contrast, were divided into a number of independent bodies under different chieftains. In time of war these chieftains drew lots to select a leader, who was followed by the other chieftains until the war ended.

In the 3rd and 4th centuries, the Saxons fought their way victoriously towards the west, and their name was given to the great tribal confederation that stretched towards the west exactly to the former boundary of the Roman Empire, almost to the Rhine. Only a small strip of land on the right bank of the Rhine remained to the Frankish tribe. Towards the south the Saxons pushed as far as the Harz Mountains and the Eichsfeld, and in the succeeding centuries they absorbed the greater part of Thuringia. In the east their power extended at first as far as the Elbe and Saale Rivers. In later centuries it extended much farther. The whole coast of the North Sea (the German Ocean) belonged to the Saxons except the part west of the Weser that the Frisians retained.

Pagan Saxony
Ptolemy's Geographia, written in the 2nd century, is sometimes considered to contain the first written reference to the Saxons. Some copies of this text mention a tribe called Saxones in the area to the north of the lower Elbe. However, other versions refer to the same tribe as Axones. This may be a misspelling of Aviones, the name of a tribe mentioned by Tacitus in his Germania. According to this theory, the word "Saxones" was the result of later scribes trying to correct a name that meant nothing to them. On the other hand, Schütte, in his analysis of such problems in Ptolemy's Maps of Northern Europe, believed that "Saxones" is correct. He notes that the loss of first letters occurs in numerous places in various copies of Ptolemy's work, and also that the manuscripts without "Saxones" are generally inferior overall. Schütte also remarks that there was a medieval tradition of calling this area "Old Saxony". This view is in line with Bede, who mentions that Old Saxony was near the Rhine, somewhere to the north of the river Lippe, roughly equivalent to Westphalia, the northeastern part of the modern German state of North Rhine Westphalia.

From the 8th century, the Saxons were divided into four subdivisions (gau): Westphalians, between the Rhine and the Weser; the Engern or Angrians, on both sides of the Weser; the Eastphalians, between the Weser and the Elbe; and the Transalbingians, in what is now Holstein. The only one of these names that has been preserved is Westphalians, later given to the inhabitants of the Prussian Province of Westphalia.

The Frankish King Clovis I (481-511) united the various Frankish tribes, conquered Roman Gaul, and accepted Christianity. The new Frankish kingdom was able to bring all the Germanic tribes except the Saxons under its authority and to make them Christian. For more than a hundred years there was almost uninterrupted warfare between the Franks and the Saxons.
After a bloody struggle that lasted thirty years (772–804), the Saxons were finally brought under Frankish supremacy by the Emperor Charlemagne. The earliest date at which it can be proved that Charlemagne had the conquest of the Saxon districts in view is 776. Charlemagne's campaigns were intended mainly to punish the Saxons for their annual marauding expeditions to the Rhine. Charlemagne also vigorously pursued the conversion of the Saxons to Christianity, which involved the Frankish emperor in the suppression of the native religion and brutalities such as the execution of 4,500 Saxons at Verden in 782.

Medieval Duchy of Saxony and Duchy of Saxe-Wittenberg (880–1356)

When the Frankish kingdom was divided by the Treaty of Verdun (843) the territory east of the Rhine became the East Frankish Kingdom, from which the present Germany has developed. A strong central authority was lacking during the reigns of the weak East Frankish kings of the Carolingian dynasty. Each German tribe was forced to rely upon itself for defence against the incursions of the Norsemen from the north and of the Slavs from the east, consequently the tribes once more chose dukes as rulers. The first Saxon duke was Otto the Illustrious (880–912) of the Liudolfinger line (descendants of Liudolf); Otto was able to extend his power over Thuringia. Otto's son Henry was elected king of Germany (919–936); Henry is justly called the real founder of the German Empire. His son Otto I (936–973) was the first non-Carolingian German king to receive from the pope the imperial Roman crown (962). Otto I was followed as king and emperor by his son Otto II (973–983), who was succeeded by his son Otto III (983–1002).

The line of Saxon emperors expired with Henry II (1002–1024). Henry I had been both King of Germany and Duke of Saxony at the same time. Mainly for the sake of his ducal possessions he had carried on a long and difficult struggle with the Slavs on the eastern boundary of his country. The Emperor Otto I was also for the greater part of his reign Duke of Saxony. He divided the region he had acquired into several margraviates, the most important being: the North Mark, out of which in the course of time the Kingdom of Prussia developed, and the Margraviate of Meissen, from which sprang the Kingdom of Saxony. Each mark was divided into districts, not only for military and political purposes but also for ecclesiastical: the central point of each district was a fortified castle.

Otto I laid the basis of the organization of the Church in this territory by making the chief fortified places which he established in the different marks the sees of dioceses. In 960 Otto I had transferred the ducal authority over Saxony to Margrave Hermann Billung, who had distinguished himself in the struggle with the Slavs, and the ducal title became hereditary in Count Hermann's family. This old Duchy of Saxony, as it is called in distinction from the Duchy of Saxe-Wittenberg, became the centre of the opposition of the German princes to the imperial power during the era of the Franconian or Salian emperors. With the death of Duke Magnus in 1106 the Saxon ducal family, frequently called the Billung line, became extinct. The Emperor Henry V (1106–25) gave the Duchy of Saxony in fief to Count Lothair of Supplinburg, who in 1125 became King of Germany, and at his death (1137) transferred the Duchy of Saxony to his son-in-law, Duke Henry the Proud, of the princely family of the Welf (Guelph). Henry the Lion refused to aid the Emperor Frederick I Barbarossa in his campaign against the cities of Lombardy in 1176, consequently in 1180 the ban of the empire was proclaimed against Henry at Würzburg, and 1181 the old Duchy of Saxony was cut up at the Diet of Gelnhausen into many small portions. The greater share of its western portion was given, as the Duchy of Westphalia, to the Archbishopric of Cologne. The Saxon bishops, who had before this possessed sovereign authority in their territories, though under the suzerainty of the Duke of Saxony, gained imperial immediacy subject only to the imperial government; the case was the same with a large number of secular counties and cities.

The Diet of Gelnhausen is of much importance in the history of Germany. The Emperor Frederick executed here a great legal act. Yet the splitting up of the extensive country of the Saxons into a large number of principalities subject only to the imperial government was one of the causes of the system of petty states which proved so disadvantageous to Germany in its later history. The territory of the old duchy never again bore the name of Saxony; the large western part acquired the name of Westphalia. However, as regards customs and peculiarities of speech, the designation Lower Saxony was still in existence for the districts on the lower Elbe, that is, the northern part of the Province of Saxony, Hanover, Hamburg, etc., in distinction from Upper Saxony, that is, the Kingdom of Saxony, and Thuringia. From the era of the conversion of the Saxons up to the revolt of the 16th century, a rich religious life was developed in the territory included in the medieval Duchy of Saxony. Art, learning, poetry, and the writing of history reached a high degree of perfection in the many monasteries. Among the most noted places of learning were the cathedral and monastery schools of Corvey, Hildesheim, Paderborn and Münster. This era produced architecturally fine churches of the Romanesque style that are still in existence, as the cathedrals of Goslar, Soest and Brunswick, the chapel of St. Bartholomew at Paderborn, the collegiate churches at Quedlinburg, Königslutter, Gernrode, etc. Hildesheim, which contains much Romanesque work, has especially fine churches of this style. The cathedrals at Naumburg, Paderborn, Münster and Osnabrück are striking examples of the Transition period. Only a few of these buildings still belong to the Catholic Church.

Palatinate of Saxony 

King Otto I established the "Palatinate of Saxony" (Pfalzgrafschaft Sachsen) in the southern part of the Duchy of Saxony, in the Saale-Unstrut region. The first Saxon count palatine from the House of Goseck was Burchard (1003 to 1017, grandson of Dedi). On the death of Frederick V in 1179, the Goseck line of counts palatine died out. That same year, the Palatinate of Saxony was enfeoffed by Emperor Frederick Barbarossa to Louis the Pious of the Ludovingian family. He left it to his brother Hermann in 1181. After Hermann's death in 1217, the Palatinate fell to his son Louis.

When Ludwig IV died on crusade in 1227, his brother Henry Raspe took over the affairs of state on behalf of Louis' underage son Hermann II. Hermann II died in 1241 at the age of 19 and Henry Raspe officially became ruler. Since Henry Raspe also remained childless, he obtained the contingent mortgage of the Palatinate of Saxony for his Wettin nephew Henry the Illustrious along with the Landgraviate of Thuringia.

After the death of the Henry the Illustrious, the Welf prince, Duke Henry I, Prince of Brunswick-Grubenhagen (died 1322) became Count Palatine of Saxony.

In 1363, a Palatinate of Saxony-Allstedt is mentioned for the first time.

Electorate of Saxony (1356–1806)

The Protestant Reformation of the 16th century began under the protection of the electors of Saxony – in 1517, Martin Luther posted his 95 Theses at the castle church of Wittenberg. The electorate remained a focal point of religious strife throughout the Reformation and to the subsequent Thirty Years' War.

After the dissolution of the medieval Duchy of Saxony, the name Saxony was first applied to a small part of the duchy situated on the Elbe around the city of Wittenberg. When in 1356 the Holy Roman Emperor Charles IV issued the Golden Bull, the fundamental law of the empire which settled the method of electing the emperor, the Duchy of Saxe-Wittenberg was made one of the seven electorates and promoted to become the Electorate of Saxony. This lent influence out of proportion to the small area of the state. In addition, electoral status required succession based on primogeniture, which precluded the division of the territory among several heirs and the consequent disintegration of the country.

Following the Thirty Years' War, Saxony's rulers and population were Lutheran. However, in the 18th century Frederick Augustus I converted to Roman Catholicism to be crowned King of Poland as Augustus II. The Polish-Saxon union and dual state continued until the death of Augustus III in 1763. Throughout this time, the population of Saxony remained largely Protestant.

In 1756, Saxony joined the coalition of Austria, France and Russia against Prussia. Frederick II of Prussia chose to attack pre-emptively and invaded Saxony in August 1756, precipitating the Seven Years' War. The Prussians quickly defeated Saxony and incorporated the Saxon army into the Prussian army. They made the mistake of keeping their units intact rather than mixing them up. Whole Saxon units deserted.  At the end of the Seven Years' War, Saxony once again became an independent state.

When in 1806 Napoleon I's French Empire began a war with Prussia, Saxony at first allied itself to Prussia, but afterwards joined Napoleon and entered the Confederation of the Rhine and the electorate became the Kingdom of Saxony with Elector Frederick Augustus III becoming King Frederick Augustus I.

Kingdom of Saxony (1806–1918)

The new kingdom was an ally of France in all the Napoleonic wars of the years 1807–13. At the beginning of the great German Campaign of 1813 the king sided neither with Napoleon nor with his allied opponents, but united his troops with those of France when Napoleon threatened to treat Saxony as a hostile country. At the Battle of Leipzig (16–18 October 1813), when Napoleon was completely defeated, the greater part of the Saxon troops deserted to the allied forces. The King of Saxony was taken as a Prussian prisoner to the Castle of Friedrichsfeld near Berlin. The Congress of Vienna (1814–15) took from Saxony the greater part of its land and gave it to Prussia, namely  with about 850,000 inhabitants; this ceded territory included the former Duchy of Saxe-Wittenberg, the former possessions of the Dioceses of Merseburg and Naumburg, a large part of Lusatia, etc. What Prussia had obtained, with the addition of some old Prussian districts, was formed into the Province of Saxony.

King John (1854–73) sided with Austria in the struggle between Prussia and Austria as to the supremacy in Germany. Consequently, in the War of 1866, when Prussia was successful, the independence of Saxony was once more in danger; only the intervention of the Austrian Emperor saved Saxony from being entirely absorbed by Prussia. The kingdom, however, was obliged to join the North German Confederation of which Prussia was the head. In 1871 Saxony became one of the states of the newly founded German Empire. King John was followed by his son King Albert (1873–1902); Albert was succeeded by his brother George (1902–04); the son of George is King Frederick Augustus III. Prince Maximilian (born 1870), a brother of the king, became a priest in 1896, was engaged in parish work in London and Nuremberg, and since 1900 has been a professor of canon law and liturgy in the University of Freiburg in Switzerland.

The Kingdom of Saxony is the fifth state of the German Empire in area and third in population; in 1905 the average population per square mile was 778.8. Saxony is the most densely peopled state of the empire, and indeed of all Europe; the reason is the very large immigration on account of the development of manufactures. In 1910 the population amounted to 5,302,485; of whom 218,033 were Catholics; 4,250,398 Evangelical Lutherans; 14,697 Jews; and a small proportion of other denominations. The Catholic population of Saxony owes its present numbers largely to immigration during the 19th century. Catholicism that can be traced back to the period before the Reformation is found only in one section, the governmental department of Bautzen. Even here there is no continuous Catholic district, but there are a number of villages where the population is almost entirely Catholic, and two cities (Ostritz and Schirgiswalde) where Catholics are in the majority. It should also be mentioned that about 1.5% of the inhabitants of Saxony consists of the remains of a Slavonic tribe called by the Germans Wends, and in their own language "Serbjo". These Wends, who number about 120,000 persons and live in Saxon and Prussian Lusatia, are entirely surrounded by a German population; consequently owing to German influence the Wendic language, manners, and customs are gradually disappearing. About 50,000 Wends live in the Kingdom of Saxony; of these about 12,000 belong to the Catholic Church; some fifty Wendic villages are entirely Catholic. There is also a large Wendic population in the city of Bautzen, where among 30,000 inhabitants 7,000 are Wends.

After 1918

After 1918 Saxony was a state in the Weimar Republic and was the scene of Gustav Stresemann's overthrow of the KPD/SPD led government in 1923. It continued to exist during the Nazi era and under Soviet occupation. It was dissolved in 1952, and divided into three smaller 'Bezirke' based on Leipzig, Dresden and Karl-Marx-Stadt, but re-established within slightly altered borders in 1990 upon German reunification. Today the Free State of Saxony also includes a small part of former Prussian Silesia around the town of Görlitz which remained German after the war and which for obvious reasons of unviability as a separate state was incorporated into Saxony. This part had been part of Silesia only after 1815 and belonged as part of Upper Lusatia to Bohemia before 1623 and previously to Saxony between 1623 and 1815.

Prussian province of Saxony

Of its population 230,860 (7.8%) were Catholic, 2,730,098 (91%) were Protestant; 9,981 hold other forms of Christian faith, and 8,050 were Jews. During the summer months about 15,000 to 20,000 Catholic labourers, called Sachsengänger, came into the country; they were Poles from the Prussian Province of Posen, from Russian Poland, or Galicia. The province was divided into the three government departments of Magdeburg, Merseburg and Erfurt.

Up to 1802 the Eichsfeld and Erfurt had belonged to the principality of the Archbishopric of Mainz; a large part of the population had therefore retained the Catholic faith during the Reformation. As regards ecclesiastical affairs the Province of Saxony had been assigned to the Diocese of Paderborn by the papal bull De salute animarum of 16 July 1821. The province contained three ecclesiastical administrative divisions: the episcopal commissariat of Magdeburg that embraced the entire governmental department of Magdeburg and consisted of four deaneries and 25 parishes; the "ecclesiastical Court" of Erfurt, which included the governmental Department of Merseburg and the eastern half of the governmental Department of Erfurt; and consisted of 2 deaneries (Halle and Erfurt) and 28 parishes; the episcopal commissariat of Heiligenstadt, which embraced the western half of the governmental department of Erfurt, that is called the Upper Eichsfeld, and consisted of 16 deaneries and 129 parishes.

See also
 Electorate of Saxony
 Lower Saxony – partial modern successor State in Germany
 Ottonian dynasty
 Rulers of Saxony
 Wettin (dynasty)

History of cities in Saxony
 Timeline of Chemnitz
 Timeline of Dresden
 Timeline of Leipzig

Notes

References
 
 Turner, Sharon: The History of the Anglo-Saxons, From the Earliest Period to the Norman Conquest, Vol. i. (London, 1852).

 
History of Saxony-Anhalt